Frank Sarfo-Gyamfi (born 30 May 1994) is a Ghanaian footballer who plays as a winger.

He has previously played for Wa All Stars in Ghana and Maritzburg United from South Africa. In 2013, he was called up to the Ghana Under 20 national team for the 2013 African Youth Championship. In 2016 he made his debut in the u23 Olympic Games qualifiers against Mozambique in Maputo.

References 

1994 births
Ghanaian footballers
Living people
2013 African U-20 Championship players
Association football midfielders
Ghanaian expatriate footballers
Expatriate soccer players in South Africa
Ghanaian expatriate sportspeople in Saudi Arabia
Expatriate footballers in Saudi Arabia
Maritzburg United F.C. players
Asante Kotoko S.C. players
Al-Suqoor FC players
Saudi Second Division players